Ricardo Morán may refer to:
Ricardo Morán (actor) (1941–2015), Argentine actor
Ricardo Morán (director) (born 1974), Peruvian director